Bansamgre  is a village in Samanda block, East Garo Hills district of Meghalaya state of India.

References

Villages in East Garo Hills district